Stille may refer to:

Geography
Stille (river), a river near Schmalkalden, Thuringia, Germany
Stille Musel, a river of Baden-Württemberg, Germany

Science
Stille reaction

History
 Stille Omgang, a religious procession in the Netherlands
 Stille Hilfe, an aid organization for SS members after WWII

Music
"Die Stille" (the silence), song by Fanny Mendelssohn
Stille (Lacrimosa album)
Stille (Chima album)
Stille (Saints & Lovers album)
Stille, album by Åse Teigland on NorCD, see list of NorCD albums

People with that surname
 Alexander Stille, American writer
 Ben Stille (born 1997), American football player
 Christoph Ludwig von Stille (1696–1752), Prussian general major
 Hans Stille (1876–1966), German geologist
 John Kenneth Stille (1930–1989), American chemist, originator of the Stille reaction
 Mary Ingram Stille (1854-1935), American historian, journalist, and temperance reformer
 Olof Persson Stille, American settler
 :de:Curt Stille (1873–1957), inventor of the Textophon
 :de:Gustav Stille (1845–1920), physician and writer
 :de:Renate Stille (1944), Brazilian diplomat
 :de: Ulrich Christoph von Stille (1654–1728), Prussian General lieutenant 
 :de:Ulrich Stille (1910–1976), German physicist
 :it:Ugo Stille (1919–1995) Russian-born naturalized Italian writer
 :sv:Arthur Stille (1863–1922), Swedish historian
 :sv:Arvid Stille (1888–1970), Swedish architect
 :sv:Giles Stille (1958) English footballer in Sweden
 :sv:Albert Stille (1814–93), Swedish ínstrument maker and entrepreneur
 :sv:Max Stille (1853–1906), Swedish ínstrument maker and entrepreneur